Dube Phiri (born 16 January 1983) is a Zambian footballer, who currently plays for Red Arrows F.C.

Career
He played for Angolan club Primeiro de Agosto in 2008, having joined the team in 2007 from Clube Desportivo da Huíla. He played for Red Arrows F.C. before that.

International career
He was a part of the Zambian squad at the 2008 African Cup of Nations.

References

1983 births
Living people
Zambian footballers
Zambia international footballers
2008 Africa Cup of Nations players
Red Arrows F.C. players
Young Arrows F.C. players
C.D. Huíla players
C.D. Primeiro de Agosto players
NAPSA Stars F.C. players
Lusaka Dynamos F.C. players
Zambian expatriate sportspeople in Angola
Zambian expatriate footballers
Expatriate footballers in Angola
Association football forwards